Namy is a rural locality (a selo), the only inhabited locality, and the administrative center of Borogonsky Rural Okrug of Bulunsky District in the Sakha Republic, Russia, located  from Tiksi, the administrative center of the district. Its population as of the 2010 Census was 526, up from 488 recorded during the 2002 Census. Philologist Zoya Basharina is a native of the okrug.

Geography 
The village is located north of the Arctic Circle, on the left bank of the Omoloy, upstream of the mouth of the Kuranakh-Yuryakh.

Climate
Namy has a Subarctic or Boreal (taiga) climate (Dfd).

References

Notes

Sources
Official website of the Sakha Republic. Registry of the Administrative-Territorial Divisions of the Sakha Republic. Bulunsky District. 



Rural localities in Bulunsky District
Omoloy basin